In mathematics, the von Mangoldt function is an arithmetic function named after German mathematician Hans von Mangoldt. It is an example of an important arithmetic function that is neither multiplicative nor additive.

Definition

Properties
The von Mangoldt function satisfies the identity

The sum is taken over all integers  that divide . For example, consider the case . Then

By Möbius inversion, we have

and using the product rule for the logarithm we get

For all , we have

Also, there exist positive constants  and  such that

for all , and

for all sufficiently large .

Dirichlet series
The von Mangoldt function plays an important role in the theory of Dirichlet series, and in particular, the Riemann zeta function. For example, one has

The logarithmic derivative is then

These are special cases of a more general relation on Dirichlet series.  If one has

Chebyshev function
The second Chebyshev function ψ(x) is the summatory function of the von Mangoldt function:

Von Mangoldt provided a rigorous proof of an explicit formula for  involving a sum over the non-trivial zeros of the Riemann zeta function. This was an important part of the first proof of the prime number theorem.

The Mellin transform of the Chebyshev function can be found by applying Perron's formula:

Exponential series

Hardy and Littlewood examined the series

in the limit . Assuming the Riemann hypothesis, they demonstrate that

In particular this function is oscillatory with diverging oscillations: there exists a value  such that both inequalities 

hold infinitely often in any neighbourhood of 0. The graphic to the right indicates that this behaviour is not at first numerically obvious: the oscillations are not clearly seen until the series is summed in excess of 100 million terms, and are only readily visible when .

Riesz mean
The Riesz mean of the von Mangoldt function is given by

One must take .

Approximation by Riemann zeta zeros

There is an explicit formula for the summatory Mangoldt function  given by

If we separate out the trivial zeros of the zeta function, which are the negative even integers, we obtain

(The sum is not absolutely convergent, so we take the zeros in order of the absolute value of their imaginary part.)

Taking the derivative of both sides, ignoring convergence issues, we get an "equality" of distributions

Therefore, we should expect that the sum over nontrivial zeta zeros

peaks at primes. In fact, this is the case, as can be seen in the adjoining graph, and can also be verified through numerical computation.

The Fourier transform of the von Mangoldt function gives a spectrum with spikes at ordinates equal to the imaginary parts of the Riemann zeta function zeros. This is sometimes called a duality.

Generalized von Mangoldt function 

The functions

where  denotes the Möbius function and  denotes a positive integer, generalize the von Mangoldt function. The function  is the ordinary von Mangoldt function .

See also
 Prime-counting function

References

External links 
 Allan Gut, Some remarks on the Riemann zeta distribution (2005)
 
 Heike, How plot Riemann zeta zero spectrum in Mathematica? (2012)

Arithmetic functions